Now & Live is a double CD compilation-like album released in 1997 by  Paul Rodgers of Free and Bad Company fame. In fact, it is a re-release of the studio album Now including a disc of live material recorded in 1995 and issued on the album Live: The Loreley Tapes.
The album's full 24-track version, but as one CD (2003, SPV, Germany) also is known.

Track listing

CD1 NOW
The same as on the album Now (1997)
 "Soul of Love"
 "Overloaded"
 "Heart of Fire"
 "Saving Grace" (Paul Rodgers, Geoff Whitehorn, Neal Schon)
 "All I Really Want Is You"
 "Chasing Shadows"
 "Love Is All I Need"
 "Nights Like This"
 "Shadows of the Sun"
 "I Lost It All"
 "Holding Back the Storm" (Andrea Rodriguez)

Personnel
Paul Rodgers - vocals, 12-string guitar, rhythm guitar, piano on "Love Is All I Need"
Geoff Whitehorn - lead guitar, backing vocals
Jaz Lochrie - bass, backing vocals
Jim Copley - drums
with:
Clive Brown and the Shekinah Singers - choir on "Love Is All I Need"
Jennifer Phillips, Paul Boldeau - vocals on "Love Is All I Need"
Dan Priest - tambourine on "Love Is All I Need"

CD2 LIVE
The same as on the album Live: The Loreley Tapes (1996)
 "Little Bit of Love"
 "Be My Friend"
 "Feel Like Makin' Love" (Ralphs, Rodgers)
 "Louisiana Blues"
 "Muddy Water Blues" (John Bundrick)
 "Rolling Stone"
 "I'm Ready" (Willie Dixon)
 "Wishing Well" (Rodgers, Kirke, Yamauchi, Kossoff, Bundrick)
 "Mr. Big" (Fraser, Rodgers, Kossoff, Kirke)
 "Fire and Water" (Fraser, Rodgers)
 "The Hunter" (Al Jackson, Jr., Booker T. Jones, Carl Wells, Donald "Duck" Dunn, Steve Cropper)
 "Can't Get Enough" (Mick Ralphs)
 "All Right Now" (Fraser, Rodgers)

Personnel 
Paul Rodgers - vocals
Geoff Whitehorn - guitars
Jaz Lochrie - bass
Jim Copley - drums

References

Paul Rodgers albums
1997 albums
1997 live albums
Albums produced by Eddie Kramer